Is for Karaoke (also known as Relient K Is for Karaoke) is a 2011 cover album by American rock band Relient K. The first seven songs were released on July 28 as Is for Karaoke EP, and on October 4 the remaining songs were released as Is for Karaoke Pt. 2 EP, concurrently with the full-length album.

Track listing

Personnel
Band
 Matt Thiessen – lead vocals, keys, trumpet, producer
 Matt Hoopes – guitar, vocals, trumpet
 John Warne – bass, vocals
 Ethan Luck – drums, vocals
 Jon Schneck – guitar, vocals
 Mark Lee Townsend – guitar, vocals, producer
 Justin York – guitar
Additional production
Dave Hagen – assistant editor
JR McNeely – mixing
Nathaniel Dantzler – mastering

References

Relient K albums
Albums produced by Mark Lee Townsend
2011 EPs
Covers albums
Mono vs Stereo albums